Ivo Kotaška (born January 26, 1980) is a Czech professional ice hockey defenceman.

He has played in the Czech Extraliga for HC České Budějovice, VHK Vsetín and Znojemsti Excalibur Orli. He has also played in the Tipsport Liga for HC Slovan Bratislava and ŠHK 37 Piešťany.

Kotaška previously played for IHC Písek, HC Olomouc and HC Tábor.

Career statistics

References

External links

1980 births
Living people
Czech ice hockey defencemen
Motor České Budějovice players
BK Havlíčkův Brod players
JKH GKS Jastrzębie players
KLH Vajgar Jindřichův Hradec players
HC Olomouc players
Orli Znojmo players
ŠHK 37 Piešťany players
IHC Písek players
HC Slovan Bratislava players
KH Sanok players
Sportspeople from České Budějovice
HC Tábor players
VHK Vsetín players
Czech expatriate sportspeople in Poland
Expatriate ice hockey players in Poland
Czech expatriate ice hockey players in Slovakia
Czech expatriate ice hockey players in Germany